Crowhurst railway station is on the Hastings line in the south of England and serves the village of Crowhurst, East Sussex. It is  down the line from London Charing Cross. The station and all trains serving it are operated by Southeastern.

History 
Although the section of the Hastings line through Crowhurst was completed in 1852, no station existed at this location until the South Eastern and Chatham Railway (SECR) built a branch line to Bexhill West in 1902. Crowhurst served as a junction station, with Up and Down through platforms and a bay platform at the southern end of each until closure of the Bexhill West branch in 1964.  Most of the station buildings have been demolished, but the remains of the bay platforms are still visible and a small building survives on the Up side.  The station is normally unstaffed.

Services 
All services at Crowhurst are operated by Southeastern using  EMUs.

The typical off-peak service in trains per hour is:
 1 tph to London Charing Cross via 
 1 tph to 

During the peak hours, the station is served by additional services between London Charing Cross and Hastings, increasing the service to 2 tph in each direction.

References

External links 

Railway stations in East Sussex
DfT Category E stations
Former South Eastern Railway (UK) stations
Railway stations in Great Britain opened in 1902
Railway stations served by Southeastern
Rother District